One: The World is the only concert tour headlined by South Korean boy band Wanna One, a project group created through the 2017 Mnet survival show, Produce 101 to promote their second extended play, 0+1=1 (I Promise You) and their special album, 1÷x=1 (Undivided). The tour began on June 1, 2018 in South Korea and concluded on September 1, 2018 in the Philippines. They visited 14 countries including Singapore, Malaysia, Thailand,  Indonesia, Hong Kong, Taiwan, Japan, Australia and the United States.

Background
On April 3, Wanna One released a poster on their social media accounts announcing the world tour and the cities that will be included in the tour. CJ E&M announced the dates of the tour on April 6.

The first day of the three day concert of Wanna One in Seoul features a different set list due to the filming of Wanna One's reality show, Wanna One Go: X-Con. It is also where the group showcased and performed the songs off their new album, 1÷x=1 (Undivided).

Set list

 Includes filming of Wanna One Go: X-Con

Tour dates

References

2018 concert tours
Wanna One